Conspiracy is the fourth studio album by Danish heavy metal band King Diamond, and the second part of a story that began on the album Them. Conspiracy was released in 1989 and is the last album to feature drummer Mikkey Dee who left the group but recorded the album as a session member.

The song "Cremation" appears in the 2009 video game Brütal Legend.

Plot
After the events of Them, an adult King returns to the House of Amon to reclaim his rightful place as heir to the house. ("At The Graves") He makes a deal with "Them", the unseen demonic antagonists from the previous album, to return control of the house to Them in exchange for the chance to see his now-dead sister Missy again, as he believes she can help answer some of his questions. ("Sleepless Nights") He attends sessions with a therapist named Dr. Landau, who he despises, distrusts, and lies to; Landau suggests letting King's mother visit the House of Amon, and King reluctantly agrees. ("Lies") That night, Missy appears to him in a vision ("A Visit From The Dead") and warns him through a dream where he sees Landau marrying his mother. ("The Wedding Dream") The next day, King's mother indeed arrives accompanied by Dr. Landau; despite King's protestations about the deal with "Them", they enter the house, and King is ambushed and sedated by his mother and the doctor. ("Amon Belongs To Them") They then go to the local demented priest Sammael, and convince him that King is possessed by Satan and must be disposed of ("Victimized"); they put King in a coffin and burn him ("Let It Be Done"), and the album closes with King's promise to haunt them forever from beyond the grave. ("Cremation")

Track listing

"The Wedding Dream" contains the elements of "Bridal Chorus" by Richard Wagner in the introduction.

Personnel
King Diamond – vocals, keyboards, producer, mixing
Andy LaRocque – guitars, producer
Pete Blakk – guitars
Hal Patino – bass

Additional personnel
Mikkey Dee – drums
Roberto Falcao – keyboards, producer, engineer, mixing

Production
Chris Tsangarides – guitar solos producer, mixing
 Gina Immel – assistant engineer
Howie Weinberg – mastering at Masterdisk, New York

References

King Diamond albums
1989 albums
Concept albums
Albums produced by Chris Tsangarides
Roadrunner Records albums
Rock operas